The  Oliver's Gift  is a Chesapeake Bay log canoe, built in 1947, by Oliver Duke.  She measures 30'-7" long, has a beam of 7'-3". She is one of the last 22 surviving traditional Chesapeake Bay racing log canoes that carry on a tradition of racing on the Eastern Shore of Maryland that has existed since the 1840s. She is located at Davidsonville, Anne Arundel County, Maryland.

She was listed on the National Register of Historic Places in 1985.

References

External links
, including photo in 1983, at Maryland Historical Trust

Ships on the National Register of Historic Places in Maryland
Buildings and structures in Anne Arundel County, Maryland
National Register of Historic Places in Anne Arundel County, Maryland